Ceroglossus speciosus is a species of beetle in the family Carabidae.

References

Carabinae